Enemy of God is the eleventh studio album by German thrash metal band Kreator, released on 10 January, 2005. The Gothenburg influences of the band's previous album, Violent Revolution, became more prominent on this album. It was released by SPV/Steamhammer on 10 January in Europe and South America and on 11 January 2005 in North America. 

On 27 October 2006, the album was re-released in a digipak under the name Enemy of God: Revisited, with a 5.1 DTS 96/24 mix, featuring two bonus tracks from the Japanese edition and a bonus DVD.

Track listing

A limited edition digipak was also released with a bonus DVD (PAL format and a very limited edition with DVD NTSC format in North America).

Credits 
Kreator
 Mille Petrozza – vocals, rhythm guitar
 Sami Yli-Sirniö – lead guitar
 Christian Giesler – bass
 Ventor – drums

Guest musicians
 Michael Amott – additional guitar on "Murder Fantasies"

Production
 Andy Sneap – production, mixing
 Joachim Luetke – design, cover art concept
 Harald Hoffmann – photography

Charts

References

External links 
 

2005 albums
2005 video albums
2006 compilation albums
2006 live albums
2006 video albums
Albums produced by Andy Sneap
Kreator albums
Kreator video albums
Live video albums
Music video compilation albums
SPV/Steamhammer albums